"Ornithocheirus" buenzeli (often mis-spelled O. bunzeli) is a pterosaur species known from parts of a humerus (upper arm bone) and part of a lower jaw found in late Cretaceous period (Campanian stage) rocks of the Grünbach Formation, Austria. While it has traditionally been classified in the genus Ornithocheirus, it is more likely an azhdarchid, though due to the fragmentary nature of known fossil remains, it is considered a nomen dubium.

References

Late Cretaceous pterosaurs of Europe
Azhdarchoids
Late Cretaceous reptiles of Europe
Nomina dubia
Fossil taxa described in 1871